Prasophyllum litorale, commonly known as the coastal leek orchid, is a species of orchid endemic to southern continental Australia. It has a single tubular leaf and up to forty flowers with red and green colouring and grows in sandhills near the sea.

Description
The flowers variously are coloured red and green and as with others in the genus, are inverted so that the labellum is above the column rather than below it. There is a short, thick, channelled yellowish-green callus in the centre of the labellum. Flowering occurs in December and January but the flowers are relatively short-lived.

Taxonomy and naming
Prasophyllum litorale was first formally described in 1990 by Robert John Bates and the description was published in Journal of the Adelaide Botanic Gardens from a specimen collected near Portland. The specific epithet (litorale) is a Latin word meaning "of the seashore", referring to the apparently restricted habitat of this orchid.

Distribution and habitat
The coastal leek orchid grows on coastal sandhills between Portland in Victoria and Port Macdonnell in the far south-east of South Australia.

Conservation
Prasophyllum litorale is listed as "vulnerable" in the Victorian Flora and Fauna Guarantee Act 1988 and as "endangered" in the South Australian National Parks and Wildlife Act 1972.

References

External links 
 

litorale
Flora of South Australia
Flora of Victoria (Australia)
Endemic orchids of Australia
Plants described in 1990